Frederick Ross Wetmore (born April 3, 1953) is a Canadian politician who was elected to the Legislative Assembly of New Brunswick in the 2010 provincial election. He represents the electoral district of Gagetown-Petitcodiac (formerly Grand Lake-Gagetown) as a member of the Progressive Conservatives. From 2018 to 2020 he was Minister of Agriculture, Aquaculture, and Fisheries in the Higgs government.

Wetmore was born in Campbellton, New Brunswick. In 1979, he started a meat cutting business in Burton, and eventually expanded to a very successful grocery store in Gagetown.

Wetmore was named to the Select Committee on Cannabis, pursuant to Motion 31 of the 3rd session of the 58th New Brunswick Legislature.

Wetmore was re-elected in the 2014, 2018, and 2020 provincial elections.

References

retired

1953 births
Living people
Members of the Executive Council of New Brunswick
People from Campbellton, New Brunswick
Progressive Conservative Party of New Brunswick MLAs
21st-century Canadian politicians